Centrodera oculata is a species of flower longhorn in the beetle family Cerambycidae. It is found in North America.

Subspecies
These two subspecies belong to the species Centrodera oculata:
 Centrodera oculata blaisdelli Van Dyke, 1927
 Centrodera oculata oculata Casey, 1913

References

Further reading

 
 

Lepturinae
Articles created by Qbugbot
Beetles described in 1913